The 1974 European Aquatics Championships were held in Austrian capital of Vienna from 18 to 25 August 1974. Besides swimming there were titles contested in diving, synchronised swimming (women) and water polo (men).

Medal table

Medal summary

Diving
Men's events

Women's events

Swimming

Men's events

Women's events

Synchronised swimming

Water polo

See also
List of European Championships records in swimming

References

European Championships
European Aquatics Championships
LEN European Aquatics Championships
International aquatics competitions hosted by Austria
European Aquatics
1970s in Vienna
August 1974 sports events in Europe